The Leicestershire Road Club is a cycling club in Leicester, England. The club has produced European and world champions.

Formation and early history
The Leicestershire Road Club is the oldest cycling club in Leicestershire.  It was formed from the remnants of the Syston and Belgrave Clubs of Leicester.

According to the Club's records, it was formed following a meeting of twelve cyclists held on 19 February 1909 at the Bell Hotel, 26 Humberstone Gate, Leicester.  The original name was 'The Leicestershire Road Clubs and Records Association'.  This was modified to Leicestershire Road Club two weeks later.  The first chairman was Mr H.E. Winks.  At a general meeting on 16 April 1909, Mr Hales was nominated to be the first president, but never took office. Mr H.E. Winks became president at the first annual general meeting the following year.

World and European champions
Ex-member Colin Sturgess, who has been inducted into the British Cycling 'Hall of Fame', became the 1989 world professional pursuit champion, over 5,000 m.  Colin also came 4th in the 1988 Seoul Olympics Pursuit, over 4,000 m.

Club members Lucy Garner and Dan McLay are both junior world 
champions.  On 15 August 2010, McLay became Junior World Madison track champion. Then, on 23 September 2011, Garner became junior world women's road race champion.

In July 2012, Garner won three European titles, in the Junior Women's scratch race, in the Junior Women's road race, and as part of the Junior Women's pursuit team (with Elinor Barker and Amy Roberts). In September 2012, Lucy Garner retained her World Junior Women's Road race title.

Colours

The club jersey is yellow, with red and blue sleeves.

Roll of honour

National championships – Men
1958	Owen Blower	1st	British best all-rounder
1964	R Smith		2nd	junior 25 mile time trial
1967	K Colyer, P Jones, C Wilson	1st	junior 25 mile time trial – team
1968	Mick Ward, Paul Bowler, C Wilson	1st	12 hours time trial – team
1968	Mick Ward	3rd	24 hours time trial
1968	Mick Ward, Eric Tremaine, Eddy Cotterill	1st	24 hours time trial – team
1989	M Dawes	1st	Peter Buckley junior RR Trophy
1989	M Dawes	2nd	junior road race
1989	M Dawes	3rd	junior 3000m pursuit
1990	Phil Rayner, Martin Webster, Martin Ludlam, Colin Griffiths	3rd	team 4000m pursuit
1991	Darryl Webster	3rd	50 km individual points
2008	Daniel McLay	1st	junior men’s scratch race (track)

National championships – ladies
1957	Roma Clarke	1st	ladies 100 mile time trial
1989	Sally Dawes	3rd	ladies 3000m pursuit 
1989	Sally Dawes	1st	ladies 3000m pursuit 
1989	Sally Dawes	1st	ladies individual points 
1989	Sally Dawes	3rd	ladies kilometre time trial
1989	Sally Dawes	1st	ladies 3000m pursuit
1989	Sally Dawes	1st	junior ladies 25 mile time trial
1989	Sally Dawes	3rd	ladies points race
1990	Sally Dawes	1st	ladies 3000m pursuit
1990	Sally Dawes	1st	ladies points champion 30 km
1991 	Sally Dawes	1st	ladies 3000m pursuit
1992	Sally Dawes	1st	ladies 3000m pursuit
1992	Sally Dawes	1st	ladies kilometre time trial
1992	Sally Dawes	2nd	ladies points race

	
British Schools Cycling Association (BSCA)

Daniel Mclay under-12 boy
2003/04  national mountain bike champion
2003/04  national cyclo-cross champion
2003/04  national roller racing champion – 500m standing start time 24.72 – national record 
2003/04  national time trial champion – 1 km time 53.82 
2003/04  national time trial champion – time 13.54 
2003/04  national grass track champion

Daniel Mclay under-14 boy
2004/05  national roller racing champion

Lucy Garner under-10 girl
2004/05  national cyclo-cross champion 
2004/05  national roller racing champion 
2004/05  national time trial champion – time 10.52 
2004/05  national hard track champion  
2004/05  national grass track champion
2004/05  national circuit race champion

Lucy Garner under-12 girl
2005/06  national cyclo-cross champion  
2005/06  national roller racing champion
2005/06  national mountain bike champion
2005/06  national circuit race champion
2006/07  national cyclo-cross champion
2006/07  national roller racing champion
2006/07  national circuit race champion
2006/07  national time trial champion
2006/07  national hard track champion
2006/07  national track Omnium champion

Lucy Garner under-14 girl 
2007/08  national roller racing champion – 500m standing start time 22.68 – national record 
2007/08  national roller racing champion – 1 km time 47.62 – national record 
2007/08  national circuit race champion
2007/08  national circuit race Series champion 
2007/08  track Omnium national champion 
2007/08  Girls Cyclocross national champion  
2007/08  pursuit national champion

Lucy Garner under-16 girl 
2008  pursuit national champion
2009  national circuit race Series champion
2009  Cyclocross national champion
2009  Cyclocross national Series champion
2010  circuit race national champion
2010  Girls national circuit race Series champion

Grace Garner under-10 girl
2005/06  national roller racing champion  
2005/06  national mountain bike champion
2005/06  national circuit race champion
2006/07  national roller racing champion

Grace Garner under-12 girl
2007/08   national roller racing champion – 500m standing start time 25.46 – national record 
2007/08   national roller racing champion – 1 km time 53.07 – national record 
2008  national circuit race champion
2009  national circuit race champion
2009  track Omnium national champion

Grace Garner under-14 girl
2010  track Omnium national champion
2010  national circuit race Series champion

Charlotte Broughton under-8 girl 
2004/05  national time trial champion – time 11.18 
2004/05  national grass track champion
2004/05  national circuit race champion
2005/06  national cyclo-cross champion  
2005/06  national roller racing champion
2005/06  national mountain bike champion
2005/06  national hard track champion
2005/06  national grass track champion 
2005/06  national circuit race champion

Kimberley North under-14 girl
2004/05  national time trial champion – time 34.44

Kimberley North under-16 girl
2005/06  national time trial champion – time 32.36

Competition records 
1952	D Lewin, O Blower, G Smith		team – 50 miles time trial	6h 10m 35s
1958	O Blower	12 Hour time trial 	271.809 mls
1958	O Blower, D Bowman, T Jobson 	team – 12 Hour time trial	772.701 mls
1969	E Tremaine	tricycle 100 mile TT	4h 31m 20s
1971	E Tremaine	tricycle 100 mile TT	4h 30m 48s
1972	E Tremaine	tricycle 100 mile TT	4h 27m 51s
1972	E Tremaine & D Gabbot	(Clayton Velo)		tandem tricycle 50 miles TT	1h 55m 28s				
1972	E Tremaine	tricycle 24 Hour TT           	457.895 mls
1992	S Dawes		ladies 3000m track TT	3m 53.292s

road records Association
1982	E Tremaine 	Lands End to John O’Groats, tricycle	2 days 6 hours 18 minutes 35 seconds

Veterans national age records
1997	OG Blower 	25 miles 65-70 yrs		54m 7s

			
World championship performances
1989	S Dawes 	2nd junior ladies Points race – Moscow
1991	S Dawes 	2nd junior ladies road race – Colorado

Honours
1972 	E Tremaine 	FT Bidlake Memorial Plaque
1989	S Dawes 	Ernie Chambers Trophy (best international junior) 
1990	S Dawes 	Ernie Chambers Trophy
1991	S Dawes 	Merkens Bowl for domestic track performances
1992	S Dawes 	Ernie Chambers Trophy	
1999	AJ Summers	BCF Gold Badge of Honour

Other Notable Results
2016       R Swinner  Race Winner Overst League

References

External links

 UCI official website

Cycling clubs in the United Kingdom
Organisations based in Leicestershire